Echelon is a video game originally published in 1987 by Access Software.

Gameplay
Echelon is a game in which the player pilots a C-104 Combat Exploration Vehicle to find a pirate base on the planet Isis in 2096. The PC version uses Access's RealSound technology.

Reception
Hosea Battles reviewed the Commodore 64 version for Computer Gaming World, stating that "If you like arcade action, flight simulation, space combat, exploration, mystery, and adventure, this game is for you".

Reviews
Zzap! - Jun, 1988
Your Sinclair - Mar, 1989
The Games Machine - Jun, 1988
The Games Machine - Jun, 1989
ASM (Aktueller Software Markt) - Dec, 1988
Crash! - Feb, 1989

References

External links
Review in Compute!
Review of Echelon with Realsound in Compute!
Review in Compute!'s Gazette
Review in Info
Article in RUN Magazine
Review in Arcades (French)
Review in Ahoy!
Review in Videogame & Computer World (Italian)
Review in Game Players

1987 video games
Amstrad CPC games
Apple II games
Commodore 64 games
DOS games
Open-world video games
Space combat simulators
Video games developed in the United States
Video games set in the 2090s
Video games set on fictional planets